Mercury, in comics, may refer to:

 Mercury (Marvel Comics), a.k.a. Cessily Kincaid, a Marvel Comics character who can turn herself into a mercurial substance
 Mercury (Amalgam Comics), a combination of the characters Impulse and Quicksilver made for Amalgam Comics
 Hermes (Marvel Comics), an Olympian god known to the Romans as Mercury in Marvel Comics
 Max Mercury, a DC Comics superhero Speedster.
 Makkari (comics), an Eternal who once used the name "Mercury" when operating as a crime fighter
 Mercury, a member of the Metal Men, DC comics characters made of elements from the periodic table
 Mercury, a member of Cerebro's X-Men

See also
Mercury (disambiguation)
Hermes (comics), as Hermes is the Roman name for the same (or a similar) god